Hedbergella is an extinct genus of planktonic foraminifera from the Cretaceous, described by Loeblich and Tappan, 1961, as: Test free, trochospiral, biconvex, umbilicate, periphery rounded with no indication of keel or poreless margin; chambers globular to ovate; sutures depressed, radial, straight or curved; wall calcareous, finely perforate, radial in structure, surface smooth to hispid or rugose; aperture an interiomarginal, extraumbilical-umbilical arch commonly bordered above by a narrow lip or spatulate flap, ...  Includes species otherwise similar to Praeglobotruncana but which lack a keel or poreless margin, hence is regarded as a separate genus rather than as a subgenus of Praeglobotruncana as by Banner and Blow (1959).

Hedbergella was named by Brönnimann and Brown in 1958, and is included in the family Hedbergellidae and the suborder Globigerinina. Hedbergella ranges through most of the Cretaceous, from the Hauterivian to the Maastrichtian at the end.

Related genera
Genera possibly related closely to Hedbergella are Asterohedbergella, Costellagerina, and Whiteinella, which are included with Hedbergella in the Hedbergellinae, but which have shorter ranges.

Asterohedbergella, which has a stellate outline, is from the Upper Cretaceous (M. to U. Cenomanian) of Israel. Costellagerina, which has a lobate outline, is from the Upper Cretaceous (Cenomanian to Campanian) and is cosmopolitan. Whiteinella, which has a pustulate surface, is from the U. Cretaceous (M. Cenomanian to M. Turonian), and is also cosmopolitan.

The species Muricohedbergella delrioensis, originally described as Globigerina cretacea var. delrioensis, was formerly accepted as Hedbergella delrioensis.

Species
Species in Hedbergella include:

 Hedbergella accurata 
 Hedbergella angularica
 Hedbergella aptiana 
 Hedbergella compacta
 Hedbergella costatus 
 Hedbergella excelsa 
 Hedbergella gorbachickae 
 Hedbergella hagni 
 Hedbergella handousi 
 Hedbergella hexacamerata 
 Hedbergella hiltermanni 
 Hedbergella hispaniae 
 Hedbergella infracretacea 
 Hedbergella kuhryi 
 Hedbergella kuznetsovae
 Hedbergella labocaensis 
 Hedbergella laculata 
 Hedbergella luterbacheri 
 Hedbergella madagascarensis 
 Hedbergella maslakovae 
 Hedbergella mitra 
 Hedbergella modesta 
 Hedbergella murphyi 
 Hedbergella occulta 
 Hedbergella porkulecensis 
 Hedbergella praelippa
 Hedbergella praetrocoidea 
 Hedbergella primare 
 Hedbergella pseudoplanispiralis 
 Hedbergella quadrata 
 Hedbergella quadricamerata 
 Hedbergella ranzenbergensis 
 Hedbergella retroflexa 
 Hedbergella roblesae 
 Hedbergella ruka 
 Hedbergella semielongata 
 Hedbergella sigali 
 Hedbergella similis 
 Hedbergella speetonensis 
 Hedbergella tardita 
 Hedbergella tatianae 
 Hedbergella telatynensis 
 Hedbergella tissaloensis 
 Hedbergella trocoidea 
 Hedbergella tunisiensis 
 Hedbergella tuschepsensis 
 Hedbergella velata 
 Hedbergella ventriosa 
 Hedbergella yezoana

References

Further reading 
 

Foraminifera genera
Globigerinina
Cretaceous life
Fossils of France
Hauterivian genus first appearances
Barremian genera
Aptian genera
Albian genera
Cenomanian genera
Turonian genera
Coniacian genera
Santonian genera
Campanian genera
Maastrichtian genus extinctions